Rosillo is a surname. Notable people with the surname include:

 Alexandra López Rosillo (born 1989), Spanish footballer
 Antonio Canales Rosillo (1802–1852), Mexican military leader
 Joaquina Rosillo (born 1993), Uruguayan handball player
 José María Rosillo (born 1952), Spanish equestrian